Elections to the Madhya Pradesh Legislative Assembly were held on 28 November 2018 to elect members of the 230 constituencies in Madhya Pradesh. It is believed that the election was a direct political battle between the BJP and the INC. One of the main centers of attraction was the contest between Congress heavy-weight Arun Yadav and the then Chief Minister Shivraj Singh Chouhan. While the Shivraj Singh Chouhan government had tried to win for consecutive 4th term, the INC fought for winning the state after 2003. The election led to a hung assembly, with the INC emerging as the single largest party and the BJP winning the popular vote.

Background 
The tenure of Madhya Pradesh Legislative Assembly elected in 2013 ended on 7 January 2019.

Schedule 
Election dates were announced on 6 October 2018 and voting was held on 28 November 2018.

Results were declared on 11 December 2018.

Surveys and polls

Opinion polls 
The opinion polls show a tough election battle between the BJP and the INC.

Exit polls 
Most exit polls predicted a "tight finish" between the BJP and the INC. According to Poll of Polls, There was a little edge to BJP over INC, however, No party got the majority to form the Government.

Results

Seats and vote-share 
The election led to a hung assembly, with the INC emerging as the largest party, with 114 seats, but failing to win a majority. The seat and vote share was as follows -:

Region-wise break up

Division-wise results

Constituency-wise results

Government formation
The counting of votes started on 11 December 2018, results were fluctuating throughout the day. On 12 December 2018 final figure of the result was declared. The INC became the single largest party with 114 seats. BJP won 109 seats. INC claimed support of Samajwadi Party's 1 MLA, Bahujan Samaj Party's 2 MLA and 4 Independent MLA . Due to no majority Shivraj Singh Chouhan, Chief Minister Of Madhya Pradesh resigned on 12 December 2018. Kamal Nath took oath on 17 December 2018 as new Chief Minister Of Madhya Pradesh and with this, INC came back to the power in State after 15 years.
However, after the resignation of 22 sitting MLAs from the INC, Kamal Nath resigned on 20 March 2020 and subsequently Shivraj Singh Chouhan of the BJP returned as the CM again on 23 March 2020.

By-elections

See also 
 Elections in India
 2018 elections in India
 2020 Madhya Pradesh political crisis
 2020 Madhya Pradesh Legislative Assembly by-elections

References

External links
Election Commission of India

Madhya Pradesh
2018
2018